"Jiwaru Days" is the 55th single by Japanese idol group AKB48. It was released in Japan by King Records on March 13, 2019, in seven versions. The single features departing member Rino Sashihara as the center performer. It debuted at number one on the Oricon Singles Chart and Billboard Japan Hot 100, with over 1.4 million units sold in Japan in its first week.

This single has been redone in Indonesian by JKT48 and in Thai by BNK48 as commemorative single of the group's 1st generation departure. Both versions was released in 2022.

Commercial performance
"Jiwaru Days" is the 48th AKB48 consecutive single to debut at number one, and the group's 36th consecutive single to sell in excess of a million copies. This made the band second to only B'z in terms of overall best-selling artists in Japan. Despite this, this was considered average in terms of AKB48's past sales, which was attributed to the cancellation of the group's General Election for 2019, which gives fans the opportunity to vote for their favourite singer from the group to front upcoming projects. This is the final single in the Heisei period.

Track listing

Charts

Weekly charts

Year-end charts

BNK48 version 

The Thai idol group BNK48, a sister group of AKB48, covered the song with the same title. It is their 1st special single for 1st generation members released on November 20, 2022.

Track listing
 Bold indicates centers.

References

2019 singles
2019 songs
AKB48 songs
Oricon Weekly number-one singles
Billboard Japan Hot 100 number-one singles